Maxwell Washburn Long (October 16, 1878 – March 4, 1959) was an American athlete, winner of 400 m at the 1900 Summer Olympics.

Having won three AAU titles from 1898 to 1900 and IC4A title in 1899 in 440 yd (402 m), 1899 an AAU title in 220 yd (201 m) and 1900 an AAU title in 100 yd (91 m), Maxie Long from Columbia University, was one of the top favorites for the Olympic title in Paris.

In Paris, Long led the race from start to finish, beating his teammate William Holland at 3 yards (2.7 m).

Later in this year, Long ran some brilliant records. On September 29 he ran 47.8 for 440 yd (402 m) and a few days later even 47.0, but the latter was on a straight track.  In 2021 he was elected into the National Track and Field Hall of Fame.

References

External links 

1878 births
1959 deaths
American male sprinters
Athletes (track and field) at the 1900 Summer Olympics
Olympic gold medalists for the United States in track and field
People from Belmont, Massachusetts
World record setters in athletics (track and field)
Medalists at the 1900 Summer Olympics
USA Outdoor Track and Field Championships winners
Columbia University alumni
Track and field athletes from Massachusetts